Sigurdsson is a Norwegian patronymic name of Old Norse origin, meaning son of Sigurd.

Sigurdsson may refer to:

Haakon Sigurdsson (c. 937 – 995), Norwegian earl; ruler of Norway from 971 to 995
Sumarlidi Sigurdsson (d. between 1014 and 1018), Earl of Orkney
Einar Sigurdsson (d. 1020), Earl of Orkney
Brusi Sigurdsson (d. between 1030 and 1035), Earl of Orkney
Thorfinn Sigurdsson (1009 – 1064), Earl of Orkney
Sigurd Sigurdsson Markusfostre (c. 1155 – 1163)